Martin Schäffl (born 13 December 1969) is an Austrian former professional tennis player.

Schäffl had a career high singles ranking of 398 in the world while competing on the professional tour, with three ATP Tour main draw appearances. He played twice at his home tournament the Austrian Open Kitzbühel and qualified for the 1991 Campionati Internazionali di Sicilia in Palermo.

References

External links
 
 

1969 births
Living people
Austrian male tennis players